Blanco y Negro ("Black and White" in Spanish) can refer to

 Blanco y Negro (magazine) in Spain
 Blanco y Negro Music, a record label in Spain
 Blanco y Negro Records, a record label in the United Kingdom
 Blanco y Negro (album), an album by A.B. Quintanilla and Kumbia All Starz
 "Blanco y Negro" (song), a song by A.B. Quintanilla and Kumbia All Starz